The Embassy of Russia in Kyiv was the diplomatic mission of the Russian Federation to Ukraine. The chancery was located at 27 Povitroflotskyi Prospekt in Ukraine's capital Kyiv.

History 
Following the independence of Ukraine on 24 August 1991, Russia recognized Ukraine's independence on 5 December 1991. Diplomatic relations between Ukraine and Russia were established on 14 February 1992 by the signing of the Protocol on the Establishment of Diplomatic Relations between Ukraine and the Russian Federation. On 6 August 1992, the Russian Federation opened an embassy in Kyiv.

During early March 2014, demonstrations were held outside the Russian embassy in Kyiv in response to a Russian intervention in Crimea. On 14 June 2014 between 200 and 300 protesters overturned several cars of embassy staff and replaced the Russian flag with the flag of the Ukrainian Insurgent Army in protest against Russian governmental involvement in the 2014 pro-Russian conflict in Ukraine. The protests were followed by "negotiations" (organised by the Security Service of Ukraine) between protesters and embassy's staff. In these the protesters demanded that the personnel of the Russian embassy "as a hotbed of anti-Ukrainian activities" should immediately leave Ukraine and that Russia should recognize that it was waging an undeclared war against Ukraine.

On 23 February 2022, the embassy was evacuated for what were described as safety reasons. The day after, Russia launched its invasion into Ukraine, prompting Ukraine to sever all formal diplomatic relations with Russia.

Previous Ambassadors
 Leonid Smolyakov (1991–1996)
 Yuri Dubinin (1996–1999)
 Ivan Aboimov (1999–2001)
 Viktor Chernomyrdin (2001–2009)
 Vsevolod Loskutov (2009), Chargé d'Affaires ad interim 
 Mikhail Zurabov (2009–2016)
 Sergey L. Toropov (2016), Chargé d'Affaires ad interim
 Alexandr Lukashyk (2016–2022), Chargé d'Affaires ad interim

See also 
 Russia–Ukraine relations
 Diplomatic missions in Ukraine
 Embassy of Ukraine in Moscow

References

External links 
  Embassy of Russia to Ukraine
Treaty about condition of situating and servicing of diplomatic missions

Russia
Kyiv
Russia–Ukraine relations